Operation Good Neighbor (Shkhenut Tova, lit. "Good neighborliness") was a directive of the Northern Command's Division 210 of Israel Defence Forces (IDF) that was responsible for civilian aid to Syrian citizens who were affected by the Syrian Civil War.

Background
In June 2016 the directive was established and in August its first activity took place. Since then, it carried out more than 110 types of aid operations. Coordination and control of humanitarian activities was managed by Good Neighbor, and Division 210 forces assisted in the transport of equipment and in securing the operations. About 400 families lived in tent camps near the border and the rest had lived in villages or in open fields. About a third of the residents were displaced persons or refugees, half of whom were minors. The patients brought to Israel for treatment were mostly treated in hospitals in northern Israel, mainly at the Galilee Medical Center in Nahariya and the Rebecca Sieff Hospital in Safed.

According to the IDF, aid to Syrian civilians was motivated by both conscience and security interests. The IDF did not want to stand by in the face of the humanitarian crisis in Syria, and aid could create a less hostile environment across the border.

Gadi Eisenkot, Israeli Defense Forces’ Chief of Staff admitted that Israel supplied rebels at the border with light weapons.

Aid was given in three ways:

 Medical aid – enabling the crossing of hundreds of children through the border for one-day treatment, assistance in the establishment of two medical centers, the transfer of Medication surfaces and items of advanced medical equipment, and the establishment of a field clinic for routine medical treatment. The clinic, "Camp Ichay", was established by an American humanitarian organization, "Friendships", based in Port Merci (Lake Charles, Louisiana) specializing in victims of humanitarian disasters in the world.
 Infrastructure – the transfer of fuel for heating, operation of water wells and bakeries ovens, the transfer of seven generators for the production of electricity, diesel, water pipes for the rehabilitation of infrastructure and educational equipment.
 Civil Assistance – humanitarian aid for residents of Syria - food and flour for bakeries, Baby nutrition products packages, diaper packages, shoes and warm clothing.

In 2017, a Maternity hospital  was opened in the Syrian village of Bariqa, without any equipment. Following its outreach to Israel, incubators, anesthesia machines and ultrasound devices were sent. The aid was partially funded from aid organizations and partly from the state budget.

On September 13, 2018, the IDF announced the closure of Operation Good Neighbor following the return of the Assad government to power in the entirety of southern Syria and along the de facto border with Israel.

References

External links

 Operation Good Neighbor on IDF website 

Military units and formations of Israel
Israeli involvement in the Syrian civil war
Israel–Syria relations
Rescue
Good Neighbor
2016 establishments in Israel
2018 disestablishments in Israel